The Feltham and Heston by-election was a by-election for the Parliament of the United Kingdom's House of Commons constituency of Feltham and Heston in the London Borough of Hounslow. The by-election was caused by the death of its Member of Parliament Alan Keen. It took place on 15 December 2011, and was held by the Labour Party candidate, Seema Malhotra.

Boundaries
Feltham and Heston covers the western end of the London Borough of Hounslow. Feltham lies in the western half of the constituency, Heston in the north. At the south of the constituency lies Hanworth, with Bedfont in the west. Across the parliamentary and borough boundary to the south-east lies Twickenham. Feltham & Heston shares the London Borough of Hounslow with the Brentford and Isleworth parliamentary constituency.

The constituency comprises ten electoral wards of the Borough of Hounslow: Bedfont, Cranford, Feltham North, Feltham West, Hanworth, Hanworth Park, Heston Central, Heston East, Heston West, and Hounslow West.

Constituency profile
Most parts of the Feltham and Heston constituency are lower on the socio-economic scale than those in neighbouring Brentford and Isleworth. There is a higher proportion of social housing, though unemployment is low by London standards. The seat also includes parts of Hounslow itself.

To the North and West, just over the border in the London Borough of Hillingdon, is London Heathrow Airport where many local constituents are employed, while there is considerable small industry in the Heston area. The constituency includes a Young Offenders Institution and a motorway service station.

Candidates
The candidature deadline was 30 November 2011.

On 24 November 2011, the UK Independence Party chose Andrew Charalambous, a former nightclub owner and Conservative Party electoral candidate. The Conservative candidate was named as Hounslow Councillor Mark Bowen on the same day.

Labour chose Seema Malhotra as their candidate on 27 November 2011 after a quickfire selection from four other candidates. Malhotra is the Director of Fabian's Women Network and was a Chair of the Fabian Society. Dave Furness was selected by the British National Party on 29 November 2011, the same day as Roger Crouch was confirmed as the Liberal Democrats nominee. Crouch is a supporter of the Liberal Democrats' Chinese branch.

Roger Cooper is the English Democrat Party chairman for their London region. David Bishop stood in the 2011 Oldham East and Saddleworth by-election in addition to being one of the 26 candidates at the 2008 Haltemprice and Howden by-election. His website explains that his party was created in protest at the capitalist system which turned Elvis Presley "into a fat media joke."  George Hallam stood on a socialist platform against austerity cuts and in favour of high rates of income tax for the highest earners. He was a candidate at the 2010 general election in the Lewisham East seat under the ballot paper description "Community Need Before Private Greed". The Green Party candidate, Daniel Goldsmith, is an IT consultant from Chiswick.

Result
The result was marked by a particularly low turnout of 28.8%, the lowest since Tottenham, April 2000 (25.4%) and West Bromwich West, November 2000 (27.3%). Whilst a low turnout is generally expected at by-elections, such a low turnout surprised many experts who attributed it to a couple of main factors: the relatively short space of time between the death of the sitting MP (Alan Keen) and the by-election, only 35 days in this case when the average since 1979 is 73; and the time of year, as it was held close to Christmas and during the long and cold winter nights. The electorate was 80,813.

Previous result

See also
List of United Kingdom by-elections
Opinion polling for the 2015 United Kingdom general election

References

External links
London Borough of Hounslow: Feltham and Heston constituency by-election 2011: Results
London Borough of Hounslow: Feltham and Heston constituency by-election 2011: Declaration of Result of Poll
BBC News Report: Results

2011 elections in the United Kingdom
2011 in London
December 2011 events in the United Kingdom
By-elections to the Parliament of the United Kingdom in London constituencies
Elections in the London Borough of Hounslow